Andro Ian Robert Linklater (10 December 1944 – 3 November 2013) was a Scottish non-fiction writer and historian.

Life
He was the youngest son of Eric Linklater, a poet, and Marjorie MacIntyre, an arts campaigner. His brother is journalist, Magnus Linklater and his sisters are the voice expert Kristin Linklater and painter Alison Linklater. His nephew, son of Kristin, is film actor Hamish Linklater. 

He was educated at Belhaven Hill School, Winchester College and New College, Oxford, where he read Modern History. At the end of the 1960s he lived in the United States, but returned to Britain to teach in Scotland and London, before turning to writing after his father's death in 1974.

His book Measuring America led to a series of books on American history, about which he was an eloquent speaker.

Linklater's book Why Spencer Perceval Had To Die focuses on the assassination of British Prime Minister Spencer Perceval, looking at the conspiracy theories surrounding it, and revealing the historical context. Antony Beevor has called it "a beautifully written portrait".

His work appeared in Prospect Magazine, The Spectator, The Sunday Times, The Guardian, The Daily Telegraph, Reader's Digest and Daily Mail.

Linklater was married to photographer Marie-Louise Avery and lived in rural Kent. He had a heart attack after a day of typically strenuous cycling while researching his next book on the island of Eigg, and died in Edinburgh Royal Infirmary a week later. His obituary in The Times said that "He took time to help aspiring writers, wrote eloquent prayers to be recited in his church, and regularly took up the cudgels on behalf of local causes."

Works
 

 
 
 
 
    (1st edition 1990)

References

External links
"Review of Andro Linklater's Measuring America",Cooperative Individualism

 Linklater discusses The Fabric of America at the Pritzker Military Museum & Library

1944 births
2013 deaths
Alumni of New College, Oxford
People educated at Winchester College
People educated at Belhaven Hill School
Scottish journalists
Scottish non-fiction writers
British military historians
Linklater family